The following low-power television stations broadcast on digital or analog channel 51 in the United States:

 K51DR-D in Wenatchee, Washington
 K51KR in Billings, Montana
 KHFD-LD in Dallas, Texas, to move to channel 13
 KXAD-LD in Amarillo, Texas, to move to channel 23

The following television stations, which are no longer licensed, formerly broadcast on digital or analog channel 51:
 K51AE in Monitor, etc., Washington
 K51AQ-D in Ukiah, California
 K51BD in Ellensburg, Washington
 K51CP in Swauger Creek, California
 K51EB in Seiling, Oklahoma
 K51GB in Santa Maria, California
 K51GG in Delta/Oak City, etc., Utah
 K51JC in Huntsville, Utah
 K54GK in Sioux City, Iowa
 KAUI-LP in Wailuku, Hawaii
 KPKS-LP in San Angelo, Texas
 KTJA-LP in Victoria, Texas
 KULX-LP in Ogden, Utah
 W51CB in Burlington, Vermont
 W51CV in Utica, New York
 W51CW-D in Wilmington, North Carolina
 W51DF in Manteo, North Carolina
 W51DO in Hampton, Virginia
 W51DU in Lafayette, Indiana
 WNHX-LP in New Haven, Connecticut

References

51 low-power TV stations in the United States